Joshua Brown is an American social historian, and Executive Director, of the American Social History Project / Center for Media and Learning, at City University of New York.

He graduated from City College of New York magna cum laude with a Bachelor of Arts in 1975, from Columbia University with an M.A. in American History in 1976, and a Master of Philosophy in American History in 1978, and with a Ph.D. in 1993.

Awards
 2010 Guggenheim Fellowship

Works
History from South Africa: alternative visions and practices, Editor Joshua Brown, Temple University Press, 1991, 
Who Built America? Volume 1: To 1877; Working People and the Nation's History, Authors Christopher Clark, American Social History Project, Nancy Hewitt, Joshua Brown, David Jaffee, Bedford/St. Martin's, 2007, 
Forever Free: The Story of Emancipation and Reconstruction, Authors Eric Foner, Joshua Brown, Random House, Inc., 2006, 
Beyond the Lines: Pictorial Reporting, Everyday Life, and the Crisis of Gilded Age America, University of California Press, 2006,

References

External links
"Interview with Joshua Brown: The Historian as Illustrator (Or Illustrator as Historian)", History News Network

City University of New York faculty
Living people
Year of birth missing (living people)
City College of New York alumni
Columbia Graduate School of Arts and Sciences alumni
21st-century American historians
21st-century American male writers
American male non-fiction writers